Delmont Cameron St Clair Hinds (born 1 June 1880 at Westbury Road, St Michael, Barbados, details of death unknown) was a coloured West Indian cricketer who toured with the first West Indian touring side to England in 1900. He was known as Fitz Hinds.

He had not played in any big matches before being selected for the 1900 tour and was described before the tour as "Good all-round cricketer, bowls well, with a peculiar action. Member of Spartan [Cricket] Club". On the tour he was sixth in the batting averages at just over 20, but his bowling was ineffective, his 6 wickets costing over 50 runs each. He was "often useful in his peculiar style, and was a keen hard working cricketer".

Returning from England he played for A.B. St Hill's team in 1900-01 and took 10-36 in his first innings against Trinidad in a twelve-a-side match. He eventually made his debut for Barbados in the Inter-Colonial Tournament of 1901-02. He was chosen for the combined West Indies team against Bennett's side in 1901-02 and Lord Brackley's team in 1904-05.

In his 12 match first class career he had a batting average of just over 20 and took useful wickets at an average of 15.

He later emigrated to the United States and in August 1913 he appeared for a 'West Indian Coloured Team' against the 1913 Australian tourists at Celtic Park, Brooklyn, New York City.

References

External links
CricketArchive stats
Cricinfo player profile

Pre-1928 West Indies cricketers
Barbados cricketers
1880 births
Year of death missing
Barbadian cricketers
People from Saint Michael, Barbados
Cricketers who have taken ten wickets in an innings